Eucalyptus shirleyi, commonly known as Shirley's silver leafed ironbark, silver-leaved ironbark, or Shirley's silver leaved ironbark, is a species of small ironbark tree that is endemic to Queensland. It has rough ironbark on the trunk and larger branches, the thinnest branches glaucous, a crown composed of sessile, heart-shaped, egg-shaped or round juvenile leaves, flower buds in groups of seven, white flowers and cup-shaped to barrel-shaped fruit.

Description
It has rough, dark grey to black, deeply fissured ironbark on the trunk and larger branches, usually glaucous branchlets. The crown of the tree is usually composed of juvenile leaves that are sessile, arranged in opposite pairs, heart-shaped to egg-shaped or round with their bases stem-clasping. Flowering occurs between March and May and the flowers are white or pale creamy yellow.

Taxonomy
Eucalyptus shirleyi was first formally described by the botanist Joseph Maiden in 1923 in his book A Critical Revision of the Genus Eucalyptus, from specimens collected from the Stannary Hills in North Queensland.
The specific epithet honours John Shirley, an educationist and scientist, who also served on the council of the Royal Society of Queensland for 33 years and was twice its President.

Distribution
Shirley's silver leafed ironbark is found in north and central Queensland from Mount Mulligan south through the Ravenshoe and Herberton areas to near St Lawrence. It grows in woodland and forest in a wide range of soils.

Conservation status
This eucalyptus is classified as "least concern" under the Queensland Government Nature Conservation Act 1992.

See also
List of Eucalyptus species

References

Trees of Australia
shirleyi
Myrtales of Australia
Flora of Queensland
Plants described in 1923